Star Awards 2002 is a television award telecast in 2002 as part of the annual Star Awards organised by MediaCorp for MediaCorp TV Channel 8. The ninth installment was held on 8 December 2012, with the ceremony hosted by Taiwanese host Timothy Chao and Channel 8 newscaster Chun Guek Lay. 28 awards were given out this year, an increase of five from last year, including three new categories awarded this year.

This is the first a movie had garnered nominations for the Star Awards ceremony. However, Best Serial Beautiful Connection became the most successful winner for the ceremony, having won three awards in the ceremony.

Winners and nominees
Winners are listed first, highlighted in boldface.

As like preceding ceremonies, Professional and Technical Awards were presented before the main ceremony via a clip montage due to time constraints. Unless otherwise stated, the lists of winners are only reflected in the table.

The main awards were presented during the ceremony

Special awards

Popularity awards

Malaysia polling

Ceremony 
Professional and Technical Awards were presented before the main ceremony via a clip montage due to time constraints. The main awards were presented during the ceremony

Presenters
The following individuals presented awards or performed musical numbers.

References

External links
Official homepage

Star Awards